Raymond Corbett Shannon (4 October 1894 – 7 March 1945) was an American entomologist who specialised in Diptera and medical entomology.

Life and career
Shannon was born in Washington D.C. He was orphaned as a child. His studies at Cornell University were interrupted by World War I, but he received his B.S. from there in 1923. He was employed by the U.S. Bureau of Entomology from 1912–1916, and again from 1923–1925. In 1926, he began graduate studies at George Washington University, and from 1927 on he was employed by the International Health Division of the Rockefeller Foundation.

He published over 100 articles on the characteristics, environment and behavior of insects and on their aspects as disease vectors. One of his discoveries, in 1930, was of the arrival of Anopheles gambiae, the mosquito that carries malaria, into the New World.

On his death at the age of 50, he left his library and insect collection to the Smithsonian Institution.

His wife was Elnora Pettit (Sutherlin) Hundley. His son was DePaul University accounting professor Donald Sutherlin Shannon, and his grandson is Academy Award nominated actor Michael Shannon.

References

Further reading
.
.
. Published by the author.
.

1894 births
1945 deaths
American entomologists
American science writers
Cornell University alumni
Dipterists
Smithsonian Institution donors
Scientists from Washington, D.C.
Place of death missing
20th-century American zoologists